Karaköy (lit. black village) is a neighborhood of Istanbul, Turkey.

Karaköy may also refer to:

 Galata, historic name of the Karaköy neighborhood
 Karaköy (Tünel), a station on the Tünel funicular railway in Beyoğlu, Istanbul

Villages in Turkey

Marmara Region
 Balıkesir Province
 Karaköy, Susurluk
 Bilecik Province
 Karaköy, Pazaryeri
 Bolu Province
 Karaköy, Bolu
 Karaköy, Kıbrıscık

Black Sea Region
 Artvin Province
 Karaköy, Şavşat
 Samsun Province
 Karaköy, Vezirköprü

Aegean Region
 Aydın Province
 Karaköy, Aydın
 Muğla Province
 Karaköy, Datça

Central Anatolia Region
 Ankara Province
 Karaköy, Nallıhan
 Karaköy, Çubuk

Mediterranean Region
 Antalya Province
 Karaköy, Elmalı
 Karaköy, Gündoğmuş
Karaköy, Bayramiç
Karaköy, Buldan
Karaköy, Çavdır
Karaköy, Kale
Karaköy, Osmancık
Karaköy, Yeşilova
Karaköy, Yenice

Southeastern Anatolia Region
 Batman Province
 Karaköy, Hasankeyf